UK Financial Investments (UKFI) was a limited company set up in November 2008 and mandated by the British government to manage HM Treasury's shareholdings in the Royal Bank of Scotland Group (RBS) and in UK Asset Resolution, which held the residual assets of NRAM plc and Bradford & Bingley. UKFI formerly managed the British government's shares in Lloyds Banking Group, until the government confirmed that all its shares had been sold on 17 May 2017. It also previously owned Northern Rock, until that company was taken over by Virgin Money on 1 January 2012. UKFI ceased trading on 31 March 2018, and its business and assets were transferred to UK Government Investments, a limited company wholly owned by HM Treasury.

History
In November 2008, UK Financial Investments was established as part of the UK's response to the financial crisis. 

In 2015 UKFI and the Shareholder Executive became subsidiaries of UK Government Investments and in April 2016 both were merged.

RBS
On 3 November 2009, the government injected further capital into RBS in particular, which resulted in HM Treasury's shareholdings in that company rising from 70% to 83%. Since then, the proportion of those shareholdings have fallen slightly to 80%, as of end-March 2014, because of new issues of shares to other shareholders during the past few years. The government's stake had further decreased to 78.3% by August 2015. That month, UKFI disposed of 5.4% of their shareholding in RBS. As of April 2020 the shareholding is 62%.

Lloyds
HM Treasury's shareholdings in Lloyds dropped from 43% to 41% in February 2010 after it issued 3.14 billion new shares, and dropped again in 2013 from 39% to 33% after it sold £3.2 billion worth of shares. A trading plan of incremental sales during 2015 reduced the stake to below 10% by the end of October. Sales resumed in November 2016, as the holding was reduced to 7.99%. By mid-March 2017, the holding was 2.95% and by late April it was just 0.89%.

See also 
 2008 United Kingdom bank rescue package
 2008 Liechtenstein tax affair

References

External links 
 
 
 WhatDoTheyKnow.com: UK Financial Investments Ltd: Freedom of Information requests

Government-owned companies of the United Kingdom
HM Treasury
Financial services companies of the United Kingdom
Northern Rock
British companies established in 2008
2008 establishments in the United Kingdom
Investment in the United Kingdom
Financial services companies established in 2008